James Cropper (22 February 1823 – 16 October 1900) was an English Liberal politician who sat in the House of Commons from 1880 to 1885.

Cropper was the son of James Cropper of Dingle Bank Liverpool. His father was the philanthropist and slavery abolitionist John Cropper, and his grandfather was James Cropper. He was educated at the Liverpool Royal Institution and the University of Edinburgh. He married Ann Wakefield, the daughter of James Wakefield of Kendal. He founded the paper mill company which eventually became James Cropper plc in 1845. He was a J.P. and Deputy Lieutenant for Westmorland and was High Sheriff of Westmorland in 1875.

Cropper was elected Member of Parliament for Kendal at a by-election in December 1880.
He held the seat until the 1885 general election, when the parliamentary borough of Kendal was abolished, and the name transferred to a new division of the county of Westmorland. In the enlarged constituency, Cropper was defeated by the Earl of Bective,
a Conservative who had previously been one of the two MPs for the undivided Westmorland constituency.

Cropper married Fanny Alison Wakefield in 1845, and they were the parents of ten children. Cropper died at the age of 77.

References

External links
 

1823 births
1900 deaths
Alumni of the University of Edinburgh
Deputy Lieutenants of Westmorland
High Sheriffs of Westmorland
Liberal Party (UK) MPs for English constituencies
UK MPs 1880–1885